Zvonimir Kožulj (born 15 November 1993) is a Bosnian professional footballer who plays as a midfielder for Polish club Sandecja Nowy Sącz.

Kožulj started his professional career at Široki Brijeg, who loaned him to Vitez in 2013 and to Branitelj in 2014. In 2016, he joined Hajduk Split. Two years later, he was transferred to Pogoń Szczecin. After unsuccessful stints with Turkish sides Gaziantep and Eyüpspor, Kožulj signed with Bruk-Bet Termalica in 2022, but never made an appearance due to an injury picked up shortly after joining.

A former youth international for Bosnia and Herzegovina, Kožulj made his senior international debut in 2016.

Club career

Early career
Kožulj came through Zrinjski Mostar's youth academy, which he left in 2011 to join Široki Brijeg. He made his professional debut against Čelik Zenica on 30 March 2013 at the age of 19.

In the summer of 2013, he was sent on a six-month loan to Vitez. On 24 August 2013, he scored his first professional goal. In January 2014, he was loaned to Branitelj until the end of season.

Hajduk Split
On 14 June 2016, Kožulj was transferred to Croatian side Hajduk Split for an undisclosed fee. He made his competitive debut for the club in UEFA Europa League qualifier against Politehnica Iași on 14 July. Three days later, on his league debut, he scored a goal in an away win over Cibalia.

Pogoń Szczecin
In June 2018, Kožulj signed a three-year contract with Polish team Pogoń Szczecin. He made his official debut for the club on 20 July against Miedź Legnica. On 19 October, Kožulj scored his first goal for Pogoń Szczecin in an away defeat to Jagiellonia. He was released from his contract in April 2020.

International career
Having been eligible to represent both Bosnia and Herzegovina and Croatia, Kožulj opted for the former, representing it on various youth levels.

In May 2016, he received his first senior call-up, for friendly game against Spain and 2016 Kirin Cup. Kožulj debuted against Japan on 7 June.

Career statistics

Club

International

Honours
Široki Brijeg
Bosnian Cup: 2012–13

References

External links

1993 births
Living people
People from Ljubuški
Croats of Bosnia and Herzegovina
Association football midfielders
Bosnia and Herzegovina footballers
Bosnia and Herzegovina youth international footballers
Bosnia and Herzegovina under-21 international footballers
Bosnia and Herzegovina international footballers
NK Široki Brijeg players
NK Vitez players
HNK Hajduk Split players
Pogoń Szczecin players
Gaziantep F.K. footballers
Eyüpspor footballers
Bruk-Bet Termalica Nieciecza players
Sandecja Nowy Sącz players
Premier League of Bosnia and Herzegovina players
First League of the Federation of Bosnia and Herzegovina players
Croatian Football League players
Ekstraklasa players
Süper Lig players
TFF First League players
Bosnia and Herzegovina expatriate footballers
Expatriate footballers in Croatia
Bosnia and Herzegovina expatriate sportspeople in Croatia
Expatriate footballers in Poland
Bosnia and Herzegovina expatriate sportspeople in Poland
Expatriate footballers in Turkey
Bosnia and Herzegovina expatriate sportspeople in Turkey